John E. Garen is an American economist, currently the BB&T Professor and Director of the John H. Schnatter Institute for the Study of Free Enterprise, and formerly the Carol Martin Gatton Endowed Professor, at Gatton College of Business and Economics, University of Kentucky.

Education
Ph.D., Economics, 1982, Ohio State University 
M.A., Economics, 1978, Ohio State University 
B.A., Economics, 1976, University of Washington

References

External links

Year of birth missing (living people)
Living people
University of Kentucky faculty
American economists
University of Washington College of Arts and Sciences alumni
Ohio State University College of Arts and Sciences alumni